Drury Township is located in Rock Island County, Illinois. As of the 2010 census, its population was 797 and it contained 328 housing units.

Drury Township was so named on account of there being a large share of the first settlers with the last name Drury.

Geography

Demographics

References

External links

City-data.com
Illinois State Archives

Townships in Rock Island County, Illinois
Townships in Illinois